Kyle Harmon (born c. 1999) is an American football linebacker for the San Jose State Spartans. He ranked second nationally in tackles during the 2021 season.

Early years
Harmon grew up in Walnut Creek, California. His father, Kevin Harmon, played football at Weber State, but died of congestive heart failure when Kyle was a freshman in high school. Kyle attended Freedom High School in Antioch, California. While at Freedom, he tallied 405 tackles and was twice named Defensive Player of the Year in the Bay Valley Athletic League.

College football
Harmon originally committed to play college football for Cal Poly San Luis Obispo. He withdrew that commitment in January 2017 and committed to the University of California. One week before the 2017 season opener, he left the Cal program. He initially announced plans to enroll at Cal Poly in January 2018. Instead, he enrolled at San Jose State University and has played college football there since 2018.

As a senior in 2021, he tallied 133 tackles (72 unassisted, 61 assisted), the second highest total among all college football players. Having an additional year of eligibility, Harmon returned to San Jose State as a graduate student in 2022. In July 2022, he was named to the Butkus Award watch list.

References

External links
 San Jose State bio

Living people
American football linebackers
San Jose State Spartans football players
People from Antioch, California
Sportspeople from Walnut Creek, California
Players of American football from California
Year of birth missing (living people)